The 1956 East Carolina Pirates football team was an American football team that represented East Carolina College (now known as East Carolina University) as a member of the North State Conference during the 1956 NAIA football season. In their fifth season under head coach Jack Boone, the team compiled a 2–7–1 record.

Schedule

References

East Carolina
East Carolina Pirates football seasons
East Carolina Pirates football